The 2006–07 season is Paksi FC's 1st competitive season, 1st consecutive season in the OTP Bank Liga and 54th year in existence as a football club.

Transfers

Summer

In:

Out:

Winter

In:

Out:

Competitions

Overview

Nemzeti Bajnokság I

League table

Results summary

Results by round

Matches

Hungarian Cup

Statistics

Appearances and goals 
Last updated on 2 March 2023.

|-
|colspan="14"|Youth players:

|-
|colspan="14"|Out to loan:

|-
|colspan="14"|Players no longer at the club:

|}

Top scorers
Includes all competitive matches. The list is sorted by shirt number when total goals are equal.
Last updated on 2 March 2023

Disciplinary record
Includes all competitive matches. Players with 1 card or more included only.

Last updated on 2 March 2023

Clean sheets
Last updated on 2 March 2023

References

External links
 Official Website
 UEFA
 Fixtures and results

Hungarian football clubs 2006–07 season
Paksi SE seasons